SkyWest, Inc. is the holding company for SkyWest Airlines, a North American regional airline, and an aircraft leasing company and is headquartered in St. George, Utah, United States.

History
Until 2005, SkyWest, Inc. was the holding company of SkyWest Airlines, its sole subsidiary at the time. This changed on August 15, 2005, when SkyWest, Inc. agreed to acquire Atlantic Southeast Airlines (ASA) from Delta amidst Delta's bankruptcy proceedings for $425 million. The bankruptcy judge approved the all-cash transaction, which helped Delta improve its liquidity; the deal closed on September 8, 2005.

SkyWest Airlines and ASA have maintained separate hub feeder operations at their respective hubs. The FAA classifies SkyWest, Inc. as a major airline carrier with operating revenues of USD 3.5 billion. On August 4, 2010, the parent company, SkyWest, Inc., announced that its subsidiary ASA would acquire 
ExpressJet Airlines, whose feeder network is built up in the East Coast, the South and Midwest  The merger closed on November 12, 2010, and ASA and ExpressJet integrated their operations, and was granted a single operating certificate on December 31, 2011. The combined airline rebranded as ExpressJet.

On July 11, 2012, SkyWest, Inc. signed an agreement with Mitsubishi Aircraft Corporation to purchase 100 Mitsubishi Regional Jets with an option for up to 100 more.

On May 21, 2013, SkyWest, Inc. came to an agreement with Embraer to purchase 100 E-175 Regional Jets, with an option for up to 100 more. Deliveries began in April 2014. The first 40 aircraft will be flown by SkyWest, Inc.'s wholly owned subsidiary, SkyWest Airlines, under a 12-year capacity purchase agreement with United Airlines in a 76-seat, dual class configuration.

On December 18, 2018, SkyWest, Inc. announced that it would sell ExpressJet Airlines to ManaAir, LLC, another airline holding company with ties to United Airlines, ExpressJet's sole client. The 70 million dollar deal closed on January 23, 2019.

Controversy
On November 20, 2002, SkyWest, Inc. announced it had adjusted its reports as its independent auditors, KPMG LLP (KPMG), had determined that certain revenue and expenses may have been inaccurately allocated among interim and fiscal year periods.

References

External links

SkyWest homepage
ExpressJet homepage

Airline holding companies of the United States
Aircraft leasing companies
Companies based in Utah
2005 establishments in Utah
Companies listed on the Nasdaq